Hamilton Hughes is a Fijian professional rugby league player who most recently played for the Concord-Burwood Wolves in the Ron Massey Cup.
Hughes is a Fijian international.

References

Living people
Fijian rugby league players
Fiji national rugby league team players
Year of birth missing (living people)